Takeshi Saito may refer to:

, Japanese footballer
, Japanese ice hockey player
, Japanese mathematician
, Japanese violinist